Place Bell may refer to:
Place Bell (Ottawa)
Place Bell (Laval, Quebec)